Building at 216 Bank Street, also known as Holland House Apartments, is a historic home located at Suffolk, Virginia. It was built about 1885, and is a -story, three bay stuccoed brick Second Empire style building. It has a polychromatic slate mansard roof and a full-width, one-story, hipped roof front porch. It was built for Colonel Edward Everett Holland as a single-family dwelling. It was occupied by the Suffolk Elks Lodge No. 685 from 1940 to 1965, then converted to a six-unit apartment building.

It was added to the National Register of Historic Places in 1985.

References

Second Empire architecture in Virginia
Houses completed in 1885
Houses on the National Register of Historic Places in Virginia
Houses in Suffolk, Virginia
National Register of Historic Places in Suffolk, Virginia